José Francisco "El Nene" Sanfilippo (born 4 May 1935) is a former Argentine footballer who played as a striker.

Club career
Sanfilippo was born in Buenos Aires. During his club career he played for San Lorenzo, Boca Juniors and Banfield in Argentina, Nacional in Uruguay, and Bangu and SC Bahia in Brazil.

Sanfilippo scored his first league goal for San Lorenzo on 21 November 1953 against Banfield, and went on to score 192 league goals for them up to 1962.

In 1963, Sanfilippo moved to Boca Juniors, although in 1964 he was dismissed from the club following a disciplinary incident in a match against his former club, San Lorenzo.

Sanfilippo joined Uruguayan side Nacional in 1964, after the first round of the Copa Libertadores. He scored against Colo Colo in the only Copa match he played for the club, before getting injured in a friendly match.

Sanfilippo is the 5th highest scoring player in Argentine football.

International career
At international level, Sanfilippo played for the Argentina national football team in the 1958 FIFA World Cup and the 1962 FIFA World Cup. He is the joint ninth-highest goalscorer for the Argentina national football team, alongside Leopoldo Luque, with 22 goals.

Honours

Individual
Argentine Primera División Top-scorer (4): 1958 (28 goals), 1959 (31 goals), 1960 (34 goals), 1961 (26 goals)
Copa América Top-scorer: 1959
Copa Libertadores Top-scorer: 1963 (7 goals)

References

External links

 

1935 births
Living people
Footballers from Buenos Aires
Argentine footballers
1958 FIFA World Cup players
1962 FIFA World Cup players
Esporte Clube Bahia players
Club Atlético Banfield footballers
Bangu Atlético Clube players
Boca Juniors footballers
Club Nacional de Football players
San Lorenzo de Almagro footballers
Argentina international footballers
Argentine Primera División players
Argentine expatriate footballers
Expatriate footballers in Brazil
Copa América-winning players
Association football forwards
Pan American Games medalists in football
Pan American Games gold medalists for Argentina
Footballers at the 1955 Pan American Games
Medalists at the 1955 Pan American Games